John Kenny (7 October 1883 – 15 April 1937) was a New Zealand cricketer. He played one first-class match for Otago in 1911/12.

See also
 List of Otago representative cricketers

References

External links
 

1883 births
1937 deaths
New Zealand cricketers
Otago cricketers
Cricketers from Dunedin